IIF may refer to:

 IIf (abbreviation for immediate if) and ?:, the inline-if computing function
 Indirect immunofluorescence, one of several types of immunofluorescence
 Institute of International Finance, an association of international financial institutions
 International Indonesia Forum, an organisation which holds annual interdisciplinary seminars in Indonesia.
 International Institute of Forecasters, a nonprofit organization devoted to advancing the science of forecasting
 Intuit Interchange Format, a file format used by Intuit's Quickbooks software

See also 
 IFF (disambiguation)